Darrellyn "Lyn" Hellegaard (née Bingham; born March 29, 1958) is an American politician who is currently serving as a member of the Montana House of Representatives from the 97th district. She is a member of the Republican Party.

Biography 
Hellegaard was born Darrellyn Bingham on March 29, 1958, in the city of Moab, Utah, to Darrell Albert Bingham (1924–2011) and Sarah Leman. She married Steven Charles "Steve" Hellegaard on April 21, 1979, in Ravalli, Montana. They have two children.

References 

Living people
1958 births
21st-century American politicians
Republican Party members of the Montana House of Representatives
People from Moab, Utah
21st-century American women politicians
Politicians from Missoula, Montana